Mahunag is a village in Mandi district, Himachal Pradesh. There is a hot spring nearby.

References 

Villages in Mandi district
Hot springs of India
Landforms of Himachal Pradesh